The 2015 Pekao Szczecin Open was a professional tennis tournament played on clay courts. It was the 23rd edition of the tournament which was part of the 2015 ATP Challenger Tour. It took place in Szczecin, Poland between 14 and 23 September 2015.

Singles main-draw entrants

Seeds

 1 Rankings are as of September 7, 2015.

Other entrants
The following players received wildcards into the singles main draw:
  Paweł Ciaś
  Marcin Gawron
  Hubert Hurkacz
  Oscar Otte

The following players received entry from the qualifying draw:
  Robin Kern
  Mateusz Kowalczyk
  Maciej Rajski
  Artem Smirnov

Champions

Singles

  Jan-Lennard Struff def.  Artem Smirnov 6–3, 6–4

Doubles

  Tristan Lamasine /  Fabrice Martin def.  Federico Gaio /  Alessandro Giannessi 6–3, 7–6(7–4)

External links
Official Website

Pekao Szczecin Open
Pekao Szczecin Open
Pekao